Toano (locally  or ) is a comune (municipality) in the Province of Reggio Emilia in the Italian region Emilia-Romagna, located about  west of Bologna and about  south of Reggio Emilia.

Toano borders the following municipalities: Baiso, Carpineti, Frassinoro, Montefiorino, Palagano, Prignano sulla Secchia, Villa Minozzo.

References

Cities and towns in Emilia-Romagna